Julia Ciupka (born 1 November 1991) is a German field hockey player for the German national team.

She participated at the 2018 Women's Hockey World Cup.

References

1991 births
Living people
German female field hockey players
Female field hockey goalkeepers
Sportspeople from Mönchengladbach
Field hockey players at the 2020 Summer Olympics
Olympic field hockey players of Germany